Dileswar Tanti is an Indian politician from the state of Assam. He was elected to the Doom Dooma constituency 6 times and was a labour minister in the Hiteswar Saikia cabinet.

Political career 
Tanti was the Indian National Congress candidate for Doom Dooma in the 1978 Assam Legislative Assembly election. He received 13023 votes, 39.2% of the total vote and defeated his nearest opponent by 4209 votes.

He sought reelection in the 1983 Assam Legislative Assembly election. He received 8531 votes, 72.19% of the total vote and was reelected.

He was again the Indian National Congress candidate for Doom Dooma in the 1985 Assam Legislative Assembly election. He received 22755 votes, 51.24% of the total vote and he defeated his nearest opponent by 11797 votes.

He was again the Indian National Congress candidate In the 1991 Assam Legislative Assembly election. He received 36679 votes, 68.95% of the total vote and he defeated his nearest opponent by 29687 votes. He was made labour minister in the Hiteswar Saikia cabinet.

He was again the Indian National Congress candidate for Doom Dooma in 1996. He received 40505 votes, 67.17% of the total vote, defeating his nearest opponent by 29960 votes.

Tanti was again the congress candidate for Doom Dooma in 2001. He received 52846 votes, 77.93% of the total vote. He defeated his nearest opponent by 37878 votes.

Tanti did not receive the congress nomination in the 2006 Assam Legislative Assembly election and instead was the Nationalist Comgress Party candidate. He received 17299 votes, coming third to Congress candidate Durga Bhumij, after serving as MLA for 28 years.

References 

Assam MLAs 1978–1983
Assam MLAs 1983–1985
Assam MLAs 1985–1991
Assam MLAs 1991–1996
Assam MLAs 1996–2001
Assam MLAs 2001–2006
Living people
Year of birth missing (living people)
Indian National Congress politicians from Assam